Empire of Lust (lit. "The Age of Innocence") is a 2015 South Korean period film starring Shin Ha-kyun, Jang Hyuk, Kang Han-na and Kang Ha-neul.

Plot
Kim Min-jae (Shin Ha-kyun), is a brilliant general who's distinguished himself by protecting the borders of the recently established Joseon dynasty. He keeps a close eye on Yi Bang-won (Jang Hyuk), the fifth son of King Taejo (Son Byong-ho), whom he believes has ambitions of seizing the throne. Jin (Kang Ha-neul) is Kim Min-jae's son and the King's son-in-law. Due to his position as the King's son-in-law, he is unable to take part in politics and only seeks out pleasure. Yi Bang-won was instrumental in helping his father overthrow the Goryeo dynasty and found the Joseon, but was passed over when Taejo chose his successor. Meanwhile, Kim Min-jae falls in love for the first time with a gisaeng named Ka-hee (Kang Han-na), whom he takes as his concubine, not realizing that she aims to carry out a vendetta against him.

Cast
Shin Ha-kyun as Kim Min-jae
Sung Yoo-bin as young Kim Min-jae
Jang Hyuk as Yi Bang-won, Grand Prince Jeongan
Kang Han-na as Ka-hee 
Kang Ha-neul as Kim Jin (Kim Min-jae's son)
Son Byong-ho as King Taejo
Lee Jae-yong as Jeong Do-jeon
Choi Moo-sung as Jo Yeong-gyu
Kang Kyung-heon as Lady Jeong (Kim Min-jae's wife)
Kim Da-ye as Princess Gyeongsun (Kim Jin's wife)
Kim Gu-taek as Ha Ryun
Gi Ju-bong as Jo Jun
Kim Seung-gi as Yi Je
Lee So-yoon as Sun-bun (Ka-hee's personal servant)
Hwang Geum-hee as Mae-hyang
Sa-hee as Lady Min (Yi Bang-won's wife)
Kim Young as Kim Min-jae's old servant
Moon Young-dong as Nam Eun
Yang Young-jo as Shim Hyo-saeng
Oh Ha-nee as Chwihangru gisaeng
Kim Wang-geun as the Head Eunuch
Hyun Seok-jun as the Crown Prince
Jo Hee-bong as Hwajeon shop owner (cameo)

References

External links
 

South Korean historical films
South Korean erotic films
2010s South Korean films